Save the President is a board game published by Games for Pleasure Ltd. in 1980.

Description
Save the President is a game for 2–6 players that takes place on American Inauguration Day during the President-elect's motorcade from the White House to the Capitol. Players are American or Russian undercover agents tasked with either assassinating the President-elect or preventing the assassination.

Components
The game box contains:
23" x 20" game board
6 ID cards
48 agent counters (8 agents x 6 colours)
counters for American and Russian Presidents (both wounded and unwounded)
104 Tradecreft cards
8 route control cards
6 Data sheets
 rule sheet
2 six-sided dice

Gameplay
At the start of the game, each player receives a facedown card that reveals which side they are on; this information is kept secret until the end of the game. The board, made up of a pattern of geometric shapes, represents the space between the White House and the Capitol. The route the motorcade takes is randomly determined. Each player has six agents and controls one board color, along which that player's agents can freely move. Players maneuver their agents on the board to try to set up an ambush, or to surround the President-elect, preventing an ambush. Various Tradecraft cards provide opportunities to bypass certain rules.

Ambush
In order to carry out an ambush, a Russian player must occupy one or more vertices of a shape adjacent to the motorcade. If another player's agent occupies one of the vertices, the ambushing player must invite the second player to aid in the attempt. The second player can now negotiate an agreement on how to split the points if the attempt is successful. An American player can bluff, trying to determine if the first player is actually a Russian agent, or if the first player is actually an American agent trying to determine if the second player is actually a Russian agent. The shape chosen and the number of vertices occupied determines the probability of success, which is rolled on the dice. The first successful assassination attempt wounds the President-elect, a second success is fatal.

Victory conditions
Russian players score points for participating in the wounding or killing of the President-elect. American players score points if the President-elect is alive when the motorcade reaches the Capitol. All players can possibly earn points for capturing enemy agents, but these points are not scored until the end of the game, when players' affiliations become known. If it is revealed that a player actually captured a friendly agent in error, the captured agent gets the points. The player with the most points wins the game.

Expansions
In 1996, Games for Pleasure released a small expansion for the game titled "Save the President: The Odd-Ball Scenario" that contains additional rules, more Tradecraft cards and revised data sheets.

Reception
In Issue 25 of Imagine, Mike Perry was somewhat put off by the game designer's hyperbolic claims on the box cover, but he admitted that the game was "an interesting premise." Perry noted the less-then-professional quality of the components, but he liked the inclusion of data pamphlets for each player to aid in play. He concluded that "Overall, STP does not live up to its designer's extravagant claims, but it is a strong design, offering a diverting contest of bluff and chance."

References

Board games introduced in 1980